Luis Enrique (born 1970) is a Spanish football manager and former player.

Luis Enrique or Luís Enrique may also refer to:

 Luis Enrique (singer) (born 1962), Nicaraguan salsa singer
 Neco Martínez (Luis Enrique Martínez, born 1982), Colombian footballer
 Luis Herrera (tennis) (Luis Enrique Herrera, born 1971), Mexican tennis player
 Luis Cessa (Luis Enrique Cessa, born 1992), Mexican baseball player
 Luis Capurro (Luis Enrique Capurro Bautista, born 1961), Ecuadorian footballer
 Luis Enrique Quiñones (born 1991), Colombian footballer
 Luís Enrique Peñalver (born 1996), Spanish badminton player
 Luis Enrique Cálix (born 1965), Honduran footballer
 Luis Zayas (athlete) (Luis Enrique Zayas Fernández, born 1997), Cuban high jumper
 Luis Enrique Robles (born 1986), Mexican footballer
 Luis Enrique Erro (1897–1955), Mexican astronomer, politician, and educational reformer
 Planetario Luis Enrique Erro, planetarium located in Mexico City named after the latter
 Luis Medrano (Luis Enrique Medrano Toj, born 1976), Guatemalan weightlifter
 Luis Lemus (Luis Enrique Lemus Dávila, born 1992), Mexican cyclist
 Luis Enrique Sam Colop (1955–2011), Guatemalan/Native American linguist, lawyer, poet, writer, newspaper columnist and social activist
 Luis Enrique Ferrer García, Cuban dissident
 Luis Enrique Porozo (born 1990), Ecuadorian boxer
 Luis Marmentini (Luis Enrique Marmentini Gil), Chilean basketball player
 Luis Enrique Vergara (1922–1970), Mexican screenwriter and producer
 Enrique Fernández (director) (born 1953 as Luis Enrique Fernández Marta), Uruguayan film director
 Luis Enrique Méndez (born 1973), Cuban wrestler
 Luis Enrique Camejo (born 1971), Cuban contemporary painter
 Luis Enrique Muñoz (born 1988), Mexican footballer
 Luis Enrique Fernández (born 1951), Mexican footballer
 Luis Enrique Hernández (born 1996), Mexican footballer
 Luis Enrique Delgado (born 1980), Colombian footballer
 Luis Enrique Mena (born 1992), Colombian footballer
 Luis Enrique Fierro (born 1936), Ecuadorian medic and poet
 Luis Enrique González (born 1997), Mexican footballer
 Luis Enrique Romero (born 1991), Mexican footballer
 Luis Enrique Yarur Rey (born c. 1951), Chilean heir and banker
 Luis Enrique Mercado (born 1952), Mexican politician
 Luis Enrique Benítez Ojeda (born 1969), Mexican politician
 Luis Enrique Bracamontes (1923–2003), Mexican politician and engineer
 Luis Enrique Juliá, Puerto Rican composer and guitarist
 Luis Enrique Rueda Otero (born 1910–1974), Colombian dentist

See also
 Luís Henrique (disambiguation)